Phase 2 (stylised in all caps) is the third studio album by Japanese electronicore band Fear, and Loathing in Las Vegas. It was released  on 6 August 2014 through VAP. It debuted at number 4 on Oricon chart with sales of 21,978 copies in Japan in its opening week. The single for the album, "Rave-up Tonight", was released on 25 January 2014. Its music video was nominated for the 2014 Space Shower Music Awards for Best Video category. "Rave-up Tonight" was used as theme song for arcade game Mobile Suit Gundam: Extreme Vs. Maxi Boost. Other songs of the album, "Virtue and Vice", was featured as the opening theme for anime Brynhildr in the Darkness, while "Thunderclap" was chosen for the opening theme for anime Sengoku Basara: End of Judgement.

Track listing

Personnel
Fear, and Loathing in Las Vegas
 So – clean vocals, backing unclean vocals, programming
 Minami – unclean vocals, rapping, keyboards, programming
 Sxun – lead guitar, backing vocals
 Taiki – rhythm guitar, backing vocals
 Kei – bass
 Tomonori – drums, percussion

Additional personnel
 Yasuhisa Kataoka – production, mixing
 Tuckey – mastering
 Yutty – art direction, design
 Yuji Ono – photography

Charts

Album

Single

Certifications

Awards and nominations

References

External links
 
 

Fear, and Loathing in Las Vegas (band) albums
2014 albums